Baring was launched at Calcutta in 1805 as Alexander Brodie. Her owners sold her to Portuguese interests that named her Asia Felix. They in turn sold her to British owners in 1809. The British owners renamed her Baring. She made one voyage for the British East India Company (EIC) between 1811 and 1812.

Career
Baring, Palmer & Co., owners, appeared on a list of vessels registered at Calcutta in January 1811. On 13 December 1810 a Baring arrived at Portsmouth from Bengal, Madras, and the Cape of Good Hope.

EIC voyage 
Captain Henry Templer sailed from Gravesend on 28 May 1811 and Portsmouth on 27 July, bound for Bengal. Baring reached Madeira on 14 August, and the Cape of Good Hope on 23 October, before arriving at Diamond Harbour on 13 January 1812. London-bound, she was at Saugor on  23 April, reached Madras on 8 July and St Helena 11 September, and arrived at Gravesend on 11 November. 

She returned to private trade in India, but then was admitted to the Registry of Great Britain on 24 February 1813. She entered the Registry of Shipping in 1813 with Carter, master, Murray, owner, and trade London transport.

She was then, according to one source, "Employed in the transport service and sold to the Government".

Loss: On 18 October 1814, Lloyd's List reported that "The Baring Transport, Carter, Master" had been lost at Beerhaven on 10 October. She had left Cork the day before with an expedition. The crew, and all the troops, save five men, were saved. The troops consisted of 200 men from the 40th Regiment of Foot. The Register of Shipping for 1815 carried the annotation "Lost" by her name.

Recovery: 
Lloyd's List reported on 5 December 1815 that "The Baring Transport", which had sunk in October 1814, had been raised, and apparently with little damage.

Lloyd's Register (LR) for 1816 carried Baring with Carter, master, Murray, owner, and trade London transport. She was no longer listed in 1818.

Citations and references
Citations

References
 
 
 
 

1805 ships
British ships built in India
Ships of the British East India Company
Age of Sail merchant ships
Merchant ships of the United Kingdom
Maritime incidents in 1814